Misanthropic is an EP by Dismember released as an appetizer for the Death Metal album.

Track listing
 	"Misanthropic" 	(2:59) 	
 	"Pagan Saviour" 	(3:54) 	(Autopsy cover)
 	"Shadowlands" 	(3:32) 	
 	"Afterimage" 	(4:23) 	
 	"Shapeshifter" 	(4:39)

Dismember (band) EPs
1997 EPs
Nuclear Blast EPs